McLaren Maycroft & Co v Fletcher Development Co Ltd [1973] 2 NZLR 100 is a cited case in New Zealand regarding concurrent duties in contract and tort, ruling that in situations where there is a contract, the parties can not pursue any claim in tort. This has been subsequently overruled in Price Waterhouse v Kwan

References

Court of Appeal of New Zealand cases
New Zealand tort case law
1972 in New Zealand law
1972 in case law
New Zealand contract case law